The 1N58xx is a series of medium power, fast, low voltage Schottky diodes, which consists of part number numbers 1N5817 through 1N5825.

Overview
The 1N581x are typically packaged in the DO-41 axial through-hole case, and in many cases are interchangeable with the 1N4001 series. The 1N582x are typically packaged in the DO-201AD through-hole case, and in many cases are interchangeable with the 1N54xx series.

Being Schottky diodes, the 1N58xx parts have roughly half the forward voltage drop of the 1N400x/1N540x series diodes, which improves efficiency in applications where they are usually forward-biased, such as power converters.  The cost is a lower voltage rating and higher reverse leakage current (approximately 1 mA at room temperature and increasing with temperature).

Common surface-mount relatives of the 1N58xx series are the SS1x and SS3x series, such as the SS14 (1 ampere) and SS34 (3 ampere) surface-mount parts.

See also
 1N400x general-purpose diodes
 1N4148 signal diode

References

Further reading
Historical databooks
 Rectifiers and Zener Diodes Data Book (1988, 508 pages), Motorola
 Rectifier Device Data Book (1995, 410 pages), Motorola

External links

Diodes